Marc Del Grande (born 15 March 1965 in Laxou, France) is a French senior civil servant and was the Prefect of French Guiana.

Marc Del Grande graduated at the Special Military School of Saint-Cyr.
Between 1991 and 1992, Del Grande was a military observer of the United Nations in Cambodia in the Khmer-held Angkor region.
Between 1999 and 2001, Del Grande was the commander of the Gendarmerie of Saint-Laurent-du-Maroni in French Guiana.
Between 21 July 2015 and June 2019, Del Grande was appointed as the Secretary General and Sub Prefect of Pas-de-Calais.
Since 5 August 2019, Del Grande is the Prefect of French Guiana. On 25 November 2020, Grande was replaced by Thierry Queffelec as Prefect.

References

1965 births
Prefects of French Guiana
French civil servants
French military officers
Living people